Gilberto Mendonça Teles is a Brazilian writer. He was born in Bela Vista de Goiás, state of Goiás, in 1931.

Bibliography 

 Alvorada, poetry, 1955
 Estrela-d'Alva, poetry, 1956
 Planície, poetry, 1958
 Fábula de Fogo, poetry, 1961
 Pássaro de Pedra, poetry, 1962
 Sintaxe Invisível, 1967
 A Raiz da Fala, poetry, 1972
 Arte de Armar, poetry, 1977
 Poemas Reunidos, poetry, 1978
 Saciologia goiana, poetry, 1982
 Plural de Nuvens, poetry, 1984
 Hora Aberta, poetry, 1986
 Falavra, poetry,1989
 & Cone de Sombras, poetry, 1993
 Nominais, poetry, 1993
 Os Melhores Poemas, poetry, 1993
 & Cone de Sombras, poetry,1995
 Álibis, poetry, 2000

1931 births
Brazilian male poets
Living people
Pontifical Catholic University of Rio Grande do Sul alumni
20th-century Brazilian male writers
20th-century Brazilian poets